Margav may refer to:
 Margav-e Olya
 Margav-e Sofla